The 1995 California Angels season featured the Angels finishing in second place in the American League West with a record of 78 wins and 67 losses.

The 1995 Angels went through statistically the worst late-season collapse in Major League Baseball history. On August 16, they held a 10½-game lead over the Texas Rangers and an 11½-game lead over the Seattle Mariners, but suffered through a late season slump, including a nine-game losing streak from August 25 to September 3. They were still atop the division, leading Seattle by 6 games and Texas by 7½, when a second nine-game losing streak from September 13 to 23 dropped them out of first place. The Angels rebounded to win the last five scheduled games to tie Seattle for the division lead, forcing a one-game playoff to determine the division champion. Mariners ace Randy Johnson led his team to a 9–1 triumph over Angel hurler Mark Langston in the tiebreaker game, ending the Angels' season. It was the closest the Angels would come to reaching the postseason between 1986 and 2002.

Offseason
December 6, 1994: Rex Hudler was signed as a free agent with the California Angels.
December 14, 1994: Lee Smith was signed as a free agent with the California Angels.

Regular season

Season standings

Record vs. opponents

Notable transactions
 April 13, 1995: Tony Phillips was traded by the Detroit Tigers to the California Angels for Chad Curtis.
April 18, 1995: Scott Sanderson was signed as a free agent with the California Angels.
April 18, 1995: Mike Bielecki was signed as a free agent with the California Angels.
April 26, 1995: Ricky Jordan was signed as a free agent with the California Angels.
June 1, 1995: Darin Erstad was drafted by the California Angels in the 1st round (1st pick) of the 1995 amateur draft. Player signed July 26, 1995.
July 9, 1995: Mark Sweeney was traded by the California Angels to the St. Louis Cardinals for John Habyan.
July 27, 1995: Jim Abbott was traded by the Chicago White Sox with Tim Fortugno to the California Angels for McKay Christensen, John Snyder, Andrew Lorraine, and Bill Simas.
August 24, 1995: Mike Aldrete was traded by the Oakland Athletics to the California Angels for Demond Smith (minors).

Roster

Player stats

Batting
Note: Pos = Position; G = Games played; AB = At bats; H = Hits; Avg. = Batting average; HR = Home runs; RBI = Runs batted in

Other batters
Note: G = Games played; AB = At bats; H = Hits; Avg. = Batting average; HR = Home runs; RBI = Runs batted in

Pitching

Starting pitchers
Note: G = Games pitched; IP = Innings pitched; W = Wins; L = Losses; ERA = Earned run average; SO = Strikeouts

Other pitchers
Note: G = Games pitched; IP = Innings pitched; W = Wins; L = Losses; ERA = Earned run average; SO = Strikeouts

Relief pitchers
Note: G = Games pitched; W = Wins; L = Losses; SV = Saves; ERA = Earned run average; SO = Strikeouts

Award winners
Jim Abbott, Hutch Award
1995 Major League Baseball All-Star Game
Gary DiSarcina, shortstop, reserve
Jim Edmonds, outfield, reserve
Chuck Finley, pitcher, reserve

Farm system

LEAGUE CHAMPIONS: Boise

References

External links
1995 California Angels at Baseball Reference
1995 California Angels  at Baseball Almanac

Los Angeles Angels seasons
California Angels
Los